Miss America 1938, the 12th Miss America pageant, was held at the Steel Pier in Atlantic City, New Jersey on Saturday, September 10, 1938. The decision by the 15 judges there that Miss Ohio, Marilyn Meseke, rather than Miss California, Claire James, as Miss America surprised the audience at the event. Famous Broadway producer Earl Carroll, Murder at the Vanities, also disagreed with their choice and took the runner-up to New York City where he performed a coronation of Miss California as "the true Miss America" shortly after the official pageant. Carroll's actions resulted in widespread publicity of the incident.

Results

Awards

Preliminary awards

Contestants

References

Secondary sources

External links
 Miss America official website

1938
1938 in the United States
1938 in New Jersey
September 1938 events
Events in Atlantic City, New Jersey